

Events

 
March 12 – New York police detective Joseph Petrosino is killed in Palermo, Sicily by Sicilian Mafia Don Vito Cascio Ferro while investigating the Le Mano Nera (The Black Hand). 
June – Monk Eastman is released from Sing Sing prison by the State Board of Parole. However upon his return to the East Side, Eastman finds the remnants of his gang had broken apart since Max Zwerbach's death as various factions fought among each other over what was left of the former Eastman territory. 
July 23 – Labor racketeer Cornelius Shea is sentenced to 5 to 25 years in Sing Sing for brutally slashing and stabbing his mistress 27 times in New York City.
August 15 – A violent Tong war begins after Low Hee Tong, a member of the New York Four Brothers Tong, purchases a rival Tong slave girl Bow Kum who is later murdered. 
October – English reformer "Gypsy" Smith leads a march against Chicago's South Side Levee District.
December 30 – Ah Hoon, a comedian and member of the On Leong Tong, is killed in his home by rival Hip Song members.

Births
January 12 – Charles Binaggio, Kansas City mobster
March 24 – Clyde Barrow, leader of the Barrow Gang and lover to Bonnie Parker
May 17 – John J. Vitale, boss and underboss of the St. Louis crime family
July 20 – Vincent Coll "Mad Dog", New York bootlegger and hitman
July 28 – Harry Strauss, Murder, Inc. hitman
September 13 – Sam DeStefano "Mad Sam", Chicago Outfit enforcer

Deaths
March 12 – Joseph Petrosino, New York police detective
August 15 – Bow Kum, Tong slave girl
December 30 – Ah Hoon, a comedian and associate of the On Leong Tong

References 

Years in organized crime
Organized crime